From Here is the fifteenth studio album by British rock band New Model Army, released on 23 August 2019 by Attack Attack Records in the United Kingdom and by earMUSIC worldwide. The album was recorded on the Norwegian island of Giske at the Ocean Sound Recordings studio, with inspiration drawn from the isolation of the environment. The album reached number 13 in the UK album charts on the week of release.

Track listing
All tracks written by New Model Army.
"Passing Through" – 6:00
"Never Arriving" – 5:00
"The Weather" – 4:48
"End of Days" – 4:12
"Great Disguise" – 4:36
"Conversation" – 4:12
"Where I Am" – 3:53
"Hard Way" – 5:17
"Watch and Learn" – 3:41
"Maps" – 3:54
"Setting Sun" – 6:08
"From Here" – 7:57

Personnel
New Model Army
Justin Sullivan – vocals, guitar, keyboards, harmonica
Ceri Monger – bass guitar, percussion, backing vocals
Michael Dean – drums, percussion, backing vocals
Dean White – keyboards, guitar, backing vocals, percussion
Marshall Gill – guitar, percussion, backing vocals

Production
Jamie Lockhart – producer, recording engineer
Lee Smith – producer, recording engineer, mixing engineer
Felix Davies – mastering engineer
Justin Sullivan – producer

Charts

References

External links
Official NMA website

New Model Army (band) albums
2019 albums